

Peerage of England

|rowspan="2"|Duke of Cornwall (1337)||Henry of Monmouth||1399||1413||1st Duke of Lancaster; Ascended the throne, when all his honours merged in the Crown
|-
|None||1413||1421||
|-
|rowspan="2"|Duke of York (1385)||Edward of Norwich, 2nd Duke of York||1402||1415||Resigned the Earldom of Cambridge; died
|-
|None||1415||1426||Peerage attainted
|-
|Duke of Norfolk (1397)||none||1399||1424||(Deprived of the title)
|-
|Duke of Clarence (1412)||Thomas of Lancaster, 1st Duke of Clarence||1412||1421||New creation, also Earl of Albemarle
|-
|Duke of Bedford (1414)||John of Lancaster, 1st Duke of Bedford||1414||1435||New creation, also Earl of Kendal and Richmond
|-
|Duke of Gloucester (1414)||Humphrey of Lancaster, 1st Duke of Gloucester||1414||1447||New creation, also Earl of Pembroke
|-
|Duke of Exeter (1416)||Thomas Beaufort, Duke of Exeter||1416||1426||New creation, also Earl of Dorset (1411)
|-
|Earl of Surrey (1088)||Thomas FitzAlan, 10th Earl of Surrey||1400||1415||12th Earl of Arundel; died, the Earldom of Surrey became extinct
|-
|Earl of Warwick (1088)||Richard de Beauchamp, 13th Earl of Warwick||1401||1439||
|-
|Earl of Arundel (1138)||John FitzAlan, 13th Earl of Arundel||1415||1421||
|-
|rowspan="2"|Earl of Oxford (1142)||Richard de Vere, 11th Earl of Oxford||1400||1417||Died
|-
|John de Vere, 12th Earl of Oxford||1417||1462||
|-
|Earl of Norfolk (1312)||John de Mowbray, 5th Earl of Norfolk||1405||1432||
|-
|Earl of March (1328)||Edmund Mortimer, 5th Earl of March||1398||1425||
|-
|rowspan="2"|Earl of Devon (1335)||Edward de Courtenay, 3rd Earl of Devon||1377||1419||Died
|-
|Hugh de Courtenay, 4th Earl of Devon||1419||1422||
|-
|Earl of Salisbury (1337)||Thomas Montacute, 4th Earl of Salisbury||1409||1428||
|-
|Earl of Stafford (1351)||Humphrey Stafford, 6th Earl of Stafford||1403||1460||
|-
|rowspan="3"|Earl of Suffolk (1385)||Michael de la Pole, 2nd Earl of Suffolk||1399||1415||Died
|-
|Michael de la Pole, 3rd Earl of Suffolk||1415||1415||Died
|-
|William de la Pole, 4th Earl of Suffolk||1415||1450||
|-
|Earl of Huntingdon (1387)||John Holland, 2nd Earl of Huntingdon||1417||1447||Restored to his father's Earldom
|-
|rowspan="3"|Earl of Somerset (1397)||John Beaufort, 1st Earl of Somerset||1397||1410||Died
|-
|Henry Beaufort, 2nd Earl of Somerset||1410||1418||Died
|-
|John Beaufort, 3rd Earl of Somerset||1418||1444||
|-
|Earl of Westmorland (1397)||Ralph Neville, 1st Earl of Westmorland||1397||1425||
|-
|Earl of Cambridge (1414)||Richard, 1st Earl of Cambridge||1414||1415||Attainted, and his honours became forfeited
|-
|Earl of Northumberland (1416)||Henry Percy, 2nd Earl of Northumberland||1416||1455||Either a new creation, or restoration of 1377 creation
|-
|rowspan="2"|Baron de Ros (1264)||William de Ros, 6th Baron de Ros||1393||1414||Died
|-
|John de Ros, 7th Baron de Ros||1414||1421||
|-
|Baron Berkeley (1295)||Thomas de Berkeley, 5th Baron Berkeley||1368||1417||Died, title extinct
|- 
|Baron Fauconberg (1295)||in abeyance||1407||1429||
|- 
|rowspan="2"|Baron FitzWalter (1295)||Humphrey FitzWalter, 6th Baron FitzWalter||1406||1415||Died
|- 
|Walter FitzWalter, 7th Baron FitzWalter||1415||1431||
|- 
|Baron FitzWarine (1295)||Fulke FitzWarine, 7th Baron FitzWarine||1407||1420||
|- 
|Baron Grey de Wilton (1295)||Richard Grey, 6th Baron Grey de Wilton||1396||1442||
|-
|Baron Mauley (1295)||Peter de Mauley, 4th Baron Mauley||1383||1415||Died, Barony fell into abeyance
|- 
|Baron Clinton (1299)||William de Clinton, 4th Baron Clinton||1398||1431||
|- 
|Baron De La Warr (1299)||Thomas la Warr, 5th Baron De La Warr||1398||1427||
|- 
|rowspan="2"|Baron Ferrers of Chartley (1299)||Robert de Ferrers, 5th Baron Ferrers of Chartley||1367||1413||Died
|- 
|Edmund de Ferrers, 6th Baron Ferrers of Chartley||1413||1435||
|- 
|rowspan="2"|Baron Lovel (1299)||John Lovel, 6th Baron Lovel||1408||1414||Died
|- 
|William Lovel, 7th Baron Lovel||1414||1455||
|- 
|rowspan="2"|Baron Scales (1299)||Robert de Scales, 6th Baron Scales||1402||1419||Died
|- 
|Thomas de Scales, 7th Baron Scales||1419||1460||
|- 
|Baron Welles (1299)||John de Welles, 5th Baron Welles||1361||1421||
|- 
|Baron de Clifford (1299)||John Clifford, 7th Baron de Clifford||1391-3||1422||
|- 
|Baron Ferrers of Groby (1299)||William Ferrers, 5th Baron Ferrers of Groby||1388||1445||
|- 
|Baron Furnivall (1299)||John Talbot, 6th Baron Furnivall||1407||1453||jure uxoris
|- 
|Baron Latimer (1299)||EJohn Nevill, 6th Baron Latimer||1395||1430||
|- 
|rowspan="2"|Baron Morley (1299)||Thomas de Morley, 4th Baron Morley||1379||1416||Died
|- 
|Thomas de Morley, 5th Baron Morley||1416||1435||
|- 
|Baron Strange of Knockyn (1299)||Richard le Strange, 7th Baron Strange of Knockyn||1397||1449||
|- 
|Baron Boteler of Wemme (1308)||Elizabeth Le Boteler, de jure Baroness Boteler of Wemme||1361||1411||Died, Barony fell into abeyance
|- 
|rowspan="2"|Baron Zouche of Haryngworth (1308)||William la Zouche, 4th Baron Zouche||1396||1415||Died
|- 
|William la Zouche, 5th Baron Zouche||1415||1463||
|- 
|rowspan="2"|Baron Beaumont (1309)||Henry Beaumont, 5th Baron Beaumont||1396||1413||Died
|- 
|John Beaumont, 6th Baron Beaumont||1416||1460||
|- 
|rowspan="3"|Baron Strange of Blackmere (1309)||Ankaret Lestrangee, suo jure Baroness Strange of Blackmere||1383||1413||Died
|- 
|Gilbert Talbot, 8th Baron Strange of Blackmere||1413||1419||Died
|- 
|Ankaret Talbot, 9th Baroness Strange of Blackmere||1419||1421||
|- 
|Baron Audley of Heleigh (1313)||James Tuchet, 5th Baron Audley||1408||1459||
|- 
|Baron Cobham of Kent (1313)||Joan Oldcastle, 4th Baroness Cobham||1408||1434||
|- 
|Baron Cherleton (1313)||Edward Cherleton, 5th Baron Cherleton||1401||1421||
|- 
|Baron Willoughby de Eresby (1313)||Robert Willoughby, 6th Baron Willoughby de Eresby||1409||1452||
|- 
|Baron Holand (1314)||Maud de Holland, suo jure Baroness Holand||1373||1420||
|- 
|Baron Dacre (1321)||Thomas Dacre, 6th Baron Dacre||1398||1458||
|- 
|Baron FitzHugh (1321)||Henry FitzHugh, 3rd Baron FitzHugh||1386||1425||
|- 
|rowspan="2"|Baron Greystock (1321)||Ralph de Greystock, 3rd Baron Greystock||1358||1417||Died
|- 
|John de Greystock, 4th Baron Greystock||1417||1436||
|- 
|Baron Grey of Ruthin (1325)||Reginald Grey, 3rd Baron Grey de Ruthyn||1388||1441||
|- 
|rowspan="2"|Baron Harington (1326)||John Harington, 4th Baron Harington||1406||1418||
|- 
|William Harington, 5th Baron Harington||1418||1458||
|- 
|rowspan="2"|Baron Burghersh (1330)||Richard le Despenser, 4th Baron Burghersh||1409||1414||Died
|- 
|Isabel le Despencer, suo jure Baroness Burgersh||1414||1440||
|- 
|Baron Maltravers (1330)||John Fitzalan, 3rd Baron Maltraveres||1405||1421||Summoned as Earl of Arundel, see above
|- 
|rowspan="2"|Baron Darcy de Knayth (1332)||John Darcy, 5th Baron Darcy de Knayth||1398||1411||Died
|- 
|Philip Darcy, 6th Baron Darcy de Knayth||1411||1418||Died, Barony fell into abeyance until 1641
|- 
|Baron Talbot (1332)||Gilbert Talbot, 5th Baron Talbot||1396||1419||Succeeded as more senior Baron Strange, see above
|- 
|Baron Poynings (1337)||Robert Poynings, 5th Baron Poynings||1387||1446||
|- 
|Baron Bourchier (1342)||Elizabeth Bourchier, suo jure Baroness Bourchier||1409||1433||
|- 
|Baron Burnell (1350)||Hugh Burnell, 2nd Baron Burnell||1383||1420||
|- 
|Baron Scrope of Masham (1350)||Henry Scrope, 3rd Baron Scrope of Masham||1406||1415||Attainted, and his honours were forfeited
|- 
|Baron Saint Maur (1351)||Alice St Maur, suo jure Baroness Saint Maur||1409||1426||
|- 
|Baron Lisle (1357)||Elizabeth de Berkeley, 4th Baroness Lisle||1392||1420||
|- 
|Baron Botreaux (1368)||William de Botreaux, 3rd Baron Botreaux||1392||1462||
|- 
|Baron Scrope of Bolton (1371)||Richard Scrope, 3rd Baron Scrope of Bolton||1403||1420||
|- 
|rowspan="2"|Baron Cromwell (1375)||Ralph de Cromwell, 2nd Baron Cromwell||1398||1417||Died
|- 
|Ralph de Cromwell, 3rd Baron Cromwell||1417||1455||
|- 
|rowspan="2"|Baron Camoys (1383)||Thomas de Camoys, 1st Baron Camoys||1383||1419||Died
|- 
|Thomas de Camoys, 2nd Baron Camoys||1419||1426||
|- 
|Baron le Despencer (1387)||Philip le Despencer, 2nd Baron le Despencer||1401||1424||
|- 
|rowspan="2"|Baron Bergavenny (1392)||William de Beauchamp, 1st Baron Bergavenny||1392||1411||Died
|- 
|Richard de Beauchamp, 2nd Baron Bergavenny||1411||1421||
|- 
|rowspan="2"|Baron Grey of Codnor (1397)||Richard Grey, 1st Baron Grey of Codnor||1397||1418||Died
|- 
|John Grey, 2nd Baron Grey of Codnor||1418||1431||
|- 
|rowspan="2"|Baron West (1402)||Thomas West, 2nd Baron West||1405||1415||Died
|- 
|Reginald West, 3rd Baron West||1415||1450||
|- 
|Baron Oldcastell (1397)||John Oldcastell, 1st Baron Oldcastell||1409||1417||Died, title forfeited
|- 
|}

Peerage of Scotland

|Duke of Rothesay (1398)||-||1406||1430||
|-
|Duke of Albany (1398)||Robert Stewart, Duke of Albany||1398||1420||
|-
|Earl of Mar (1114)||Alexander Stewart, Earl of Mar||1408||1435||
|-
|Earl of Dunbar (1115)||George I, Earl of March||1368||1420||
|-
|Earl of Menteith (1160)||Murdoch Stewart, Earl of Menteith||1390||1425||
|-
|Earl of Lennox (1184)||Donnchadh, Earl of Lennox||1385||1425||
|-
|rowspan=2|Earl of Ross (1215)||Euphemia II, Countess of Ross||1402||1415||Resigned
|-
|Mariota, Countess of Ross||1415||1429||
|-
|Earl of Sutherland (1235)||Robert de Moravia, 6th Earl of Sutherland||1370||1427||
|-
|Earl of Douglas (1358)||Archibald Douglas, 4th Earl of Douglas||1400||1424||
|-
|rowspan=2|Earl of Strathearn (1371)||Euphemia Stewart, Countess of Strathearn||1386||1410||Died
|-
|Malise Graham, Earl of Strathearn||1410||1427||
|-
|Earl of Moray (1372)||Thomas Dunbar, 5th Earl of Moray||1391||1422||
|-
|rowspan=2|Earl of Orkney (1379)||Henry II Sinclair, Earl of Orkney||1379||1418||
|-
|William Sinclair, Earl of Orkney||1379||1476||
|-
|Earl of Buchan (1382)||John Stewart, Earl of Buchan||1406||1424||
|-
|Earl of Angus (1389)||William Douglas, 2nd Earl of Angus||1403||1437||
|-
|Earl of Crawford (1398)||Alexander Lindsay, 2nd Earl of Crawford||1407||1439||
|-
|Earl of Atholl (1404)||Walter Stewart, Earl of Atholl||1404||1437||
|-
|}

Peerage of Ireland

|Earl of Ulster (1264)||Edmund Mortimer, 7th Earl of Ulster||1398||1425||
|-
|Earl of Kildare (1316)||Gerald FitzGerald, 5th Earl of Kildare||1390||1432||
|-
|Earl of Ormond (1328)||James Butler, 4th Earl of Ormond||1405||1452||
|-
|Earl of Desmond (1329)||Thomas FitzGerald, 5th Earl of Desmond||1399||1420||
|-
|Earl of Cork (1396)||Edward of Norwich, 1st Earl of Cork||1396||1415||Died, title extinct
|-
|Baron Athenry (1172)||Walter de Bermingham||1374||1428||
|-
|rowspan=2|Baron Kingsale (1223)||William de Courcy, 9th Baron Kingsale||1387||1410||Died
|-
|Nicholas de Courcy, 10th Baron Kingsale||1410||1430||
|-
|rowspan=2|Baron Kerry (1223)||Patrick Fitzmaurice, 7th Baron Kerry||1398||1410||Died
|-
|Thomas Fitzmaurice, 8th Baron Kerry||1410||1469||
|-
|Baron Barry (1261)||John Barry, 7th Baron Barry||1392||1420||
|-
|Baron Gormanston (1370)||Christopher Preston, 2nd Baron Gormanston||1396||1422||
|-
|Baron Slane (1370)||Thomas Fleming, 2nd Baron Slane||1370||1435||
|-
|}

References

 

Lists of peers by decade
1410s in England
1410s in Ireland
15th century in England
15th century in Scotland
15th century in Ireland
15th-century English people
15th-century Scottish peers
15th-century Irish people
Peers